Shark is the naming term of all members of Selachimorpha suborder in the subclass Elasmobranchii, in the class Chondrichthyes. The Elasmobranchii also include rays and skates; the Chondrichthyes also include Chimaeras. The first shark-like chondrichthyans appeared in the oceans 430 million years ago, developing into the crown group of sharks by the Early Jurassic.

Listed below are extant species of shark. Sharks are spread across 512 described and 23 undescribed species in eight orders. The families and genera within the orders are listed in alphabetical order. Also included is a field guide to place sharks into the correct order.

Cow and frilled sharks (2 Families)
 ORDER HEXANCHIFORMES
 Family Chlamydoselachidae (frilled sharks)
 Genus Chlamydoselachus Garman, 1884
 Chlamydoselachus africana Ebert & L. J. V. Compagno, 2009 (Southern African frilled shark)
 Chlamydoselachus anguineus Garman, 1884 (frilled shark)
 Family Hexanchidae (cow sharks)
 Genus Heptranchias Rafinesque, 1810
 Heptranchias perlo (Bonnaterre, 1788) (sharp-nose seven-gill shark)
 Genus Hexanchus Rafinesque, 1810
 Hexanchus griseus  (Bonnaterre, 1788) (blunt-nose six-gill shark)
 Hexanchus nakamurai Teng, 1962 (big-eyed six-gill shark)
 Hexanchus vitulus Springer and Waller, 1969 (Atlantic six-gill shark)
 Genus Notorynchus Ayres, 1855
 Notorynchus cepedianus (Péron, 1807) (broad-nose seven-gill shark)

Dogfish sharks (7 families)
 ORDER SQUALIFORMES
 Family Centrophoridae (gulper sharks)
 Genus Centrophorus J. P. Müller & Henle, 1837
 Centrophorus atromarginatus Garman, 1913 (dwarf gulper shark)
 Centrophorus granulosus (Bloch & J. G. Schneider, 1801) (gulper shark)
 Centrophorus harrissoni McCulloch, 1915 (dumb gulper shark)
 Centrophorus moluccensis Bleeker, 1860 (small-fin gulper shark)
 Centrophorus seychellorum Baranes, 2003 (Seychelles gulper shark)
 Centrophorus squamosus (Bonnaterre, 1788) (leaf-scale gulper shark)
 Centrophorus tessellatus Garman, 1906 (mosaic gulper shark)
 Centrophorus uyato (Rafinesque, 1810) (little gulper shark)
 Centrophorus westraliensis W. T. White, Ebert & L. J. V. Compagno, 2008) (western gulper shark)
 Centrophorus zeehaani W. T. White, Ebert & L. J. V. Compagno, 2008 (southern dogfish)
 Centrophorus sp. A Not yet described (mini gulper shark)
 Centrophorus sp. B Not yet described (slender gulper shark)
 Genus Deania D. S. Jordan & Snyder, 1902
 Deania calcea (R. T. Lowe, 1839) (bird-beak dogfish)
 Deania hystricosa (Garman, 1906) (rough long-nose dogfish)
 Deania profundorum (H. M. Smith & Radcliffe, 1912) (arrow-head dogfish)
 Deania quadrispinosa (McCulloch, 1915) (long-snout dogfish)
 Family Dalatiidae (kite-fin sharks)
 Genus Dalatias Rafinesque, 1810
 Dalatias licha (Bonnaterre, 1788) (kite-fin shark)
 Genus Euprotomicroides Hulley & M. J. Penrith, 1966
 Euprotomicroides zantedeschia Hulley & M. J. Penrith, 1966 (tail-light shark)
 Genus Euprotomicrus T. N. Gill, 1865
 Euprotomicrus bispinatus (Quoy & Gaimard, 1824) (pygmy shark)
 Genus Heteroscymnoides Fowler, 1934
 Heteroscymnoides marleyi Fowler 1934 (long-nose pygmy shark)
 Genus Isistius T. N. Gill, 1865
 Isistius brasiliensis (Quoy & Gaimard, 1824) (cookie-cutter shark)
 Isistius plutodus Garrick & S. Springer, 1964 (Large-tooth cookiecutter shark)
 Genus Mollisquama Dolganov, 1984
 Mollisquama parini Dolganov, 1984 (pocket shark)
 Genus Squaliolus H. M. Smith & Radcliffe, 1912
 Squaliolus aliae Teng, 1959 (small-eye pygmy shark)
 Squaliolus laticaudus H. M. Smith & Radcliffe, 1912 (spined pygmy shark)
 Family Echinorhinidae (bramble sharks)
 Genus Echinorhinus T. N. Gill, 1862
 Echinorhinus brucus (Bonnaterre, 1788) (bramble shark)
 Echinorhinus cookei Pietschmann, 1928 (prickly shark)
 Family Etmopteridae (lantern sharks)
 Genus Aculeola F. de Buen, 1959
 Aculeola nigra F. de Buen, 1959 (hook-tooth dogfish)
 Genus Centroscyllium J. P. Müller & Henle, 1841
 Centroscyllium excelsum Shirai & Nakaya, 1990 (high-fin dogfish)
 Centroscyllium fabricii (J. C. H. Reinhardt, 1825) (black dogfish)
 Centroscyllium granulatum Günther, 1887 (granular dogfish)
 Centroscyllium kamoharai T. Abe, 1966 (bare-skin dogfish)
 Centroscyllium nigrum Garman, 1899 (comb-tooth dogfish)
 Centroscyllium ornatum (Alcock, 1889) (ornate dogfish)
 Centroscyllium ritteri D. S. Jordan & Fowler, 1903 (white-fin dogfish)
 Genus Etmopterus Rafinesque, 1810
 Etmopterus baxteri Garrick, 1957 (New Zealand lanternshark)
 Etmopterus benchleyi V. E. Vásquez, Ebert & Long, 2015 (ninja lanternshark)
 Etmopterus bigelowi Shirai & Tachikawa, 1993 (blurred lanternshark)
 Etmopterus brachyurus H. M. Smith & Radcliffe, 1912 (short-tail lanternshark)
 Etmopterus bullisi Bigelow & Schroeder, 1957 (lined lanternshark)
 Etmopterus burgessi Schaaf-Da Silva & Ebert, 2006 (broad-snout lanternshark)
 Etmopterus carteri S. Springer & G. H. Burgess, 1985 (cylindrical lanternshark)
 Etmopterus caudistigmus Last, G. H. Burgess & Séret, 2002 (tail-spot lanternshark)
 Etmopterus compagnoi R. Fricke & Koch, 1990 (brown lanternshark)
 Etmottoopoepterus decapidaaticusspidatus W. L. Y. Chan, 1966 (comb-tooth lanternshark)
 Etmopterus dianthus Last, G. H. Burgess & Séret, 2002 (pink lanternshark)
 Etmopterus dislineatus Last, G. H. Burgess & Séret, 2002 (Lined lanternshark)
 Etmopterus evansi Last, G. H. Burgess & Séret, 2002 (Black-mouth lanternshark)
 Etmopterus fusus Last, G. H. Burgess & Séret, 2002 (pygmy lanternshark)
 Etmopterus gracilispinis G. Krefft, 1968 (broad-band lanternshark)
 Etmopterus granulosus (Günther, 1880) (southern lanternshark)
 Etmopterus hillianus (Poey, 1861) (Caribbean lanternshark)
 Etmopterus joungi Knuckey, Ebert & G. H. Burgess, 2011 (short-fin smooth lanternshark)
 Etmopterus litvinovi Parin & Kotlyar, 1990 (small-eye lanternshark)
 Etmopterus lucifer D. S. Jordan & Snyder, 1902 (Black-belly lanternshark)
 Etmopterus molleri (Whitley, 1939) (Moller's lanternshark)
 Etmopterus perryi S. Springer & G. H. Burgess, 1985 (dwarf lanternshark)
 Etmopterus polli Bigelow, Schroeder & S. Springer, 1953 (African lanternshark)
 Etmopterus princeps Collett, 1904 (great lanternshark)
 Etmopterus pseudosqualiolus Last, G. H. Burgess & Séret, 2002 (False lanternshark)
 Etmopterus pusillus (R. T. Lowe, 1839) (smooth lanternshark)
 Etmopterus pycnolepis Kotlyar, 1990 (dense-scale lanternshark)
 Etmopterus robinsi Schofield & G. H. Burgess, 1997 (West Indian lanternshark)
 Etmopterus schultzi Bigelow, Schroeder & S. Springer, 1953 (fringe-fin lanternshark)
 Etmopterus sculptus Ebert, L. J. V. Compagno & De Vries, 2011 (sculpted lanternshark)
 Etmopterus sentosus Bass, D'Aubrey & Kistnasamy, 1976 (thorny lanternshark)
 Etmopterus sheikoi (Dolganov, 1986) (rasp-tooth dogfish)
 Etmopterus spinax (Linnaeus, 1758) (velvet-belly lanternshark)
 Etmopterus splendidus Ka. Yano, 1988 (splendid lanternshark)
 Etmopterus unicolor (Engelhardt, 1912) (bristled lanternshark)
 Etmopterus viator Straube, 2011 (traveller lanternshark)
 Etmopterus villosus C. H. Gilbert, 1905 (Hawaiian lanternshark)
 Etmopterus virens Bigelow, Schroeder & S. Springer, 1953 (green lanternshark)
 Etmopterus sp. Not yet described (Guadalupe lanternshark)
 Etmopterus sp. Not yet described (Chilean lanternshark)
 Etmopterus sp. Not yet described (Papua short-tail lanternshark)
 Genus Trigonognathus Mochizuki & F. Ohe, 1990
 Trigonognathus kabeyai Mochizuki & F. Ohe, 1990 (viper dogfish)
 Family Oxynotidae  (rough sharks)
 Genus Oxynotus Rafinesque, 1810
 Oxynotus bruniensis (J. D. Ogilby, 1893) (prickly dogfish)
 Oxynotus caribbaeus Cervigón, 1961 (Caribbean roughshark)
 Oxynotus centrina (Linnaeus, 1758) (angular roughshark)
 Oxynotus japonicus Ka. Yano & Murofushi, 1985 (Japanese roughshark)
 Oxynotus paradoxus Frade, 1929 (sail-fin roughshark)
 Family Somniosidae  (sleeper sharks)
 Genus Centroscymnus Barbosa du Bocage & Brito Capello, 1864
 Centroscymnus coelolepis Barbosa du Bocage & Brito Capello, 1864 (Portuguese dogfish)
 Centroscymnus owstonii Garman, 1906 (rough-skin dogfish)
 Genus Centroselachus Garman, 1913
 Centroselachus crepidater (Barbosa du Bocage & Brito Capello, 1864) (long-nose velvet dogfish)
 Genus Scymnodalatias Garrick, 1956
 Scymnodalatias albicauda Taniuchi & Garrick, 1986 (white-tail dogfish)
 Scymnodalatias garricki Kukuev & Konovalenko, 1988 (Azores dogfish)
 Scymnodalatias oligodon Kukuev & Konovalenko, 1988 (sparse-tooth dogfish)
 Scymnodalatias sherwoodi (Archey, 1921) (Sherwood's dogfish)
 Genus Scymnodon Barbosa du Bocage & Brito Capello, 1864
 Scymnodon ichiharai Ka. Yano & S. Tanaka (II), 1984 (Japanese velvet dogfish)
 Scymnodon macracanthus (Regan, 1906) (large-spine velvet dogfish)
 Scymnodon plunketi (Waite, 1910) (Plunket's shark)
 Scymnodon ringens Barbosa du Bocage & Brito Capello, 1864 (knife-tooth dogfish)
 Genus Somniosus Lesueur, 1818
 Somniosus antarcticus Whitley, 1939 (southern sleeper shark)
 Somniosus longus (S. Tanaka (I), 1912) (frog shark)
 Somniosus microcephalus (Bloch & J. G. Schneider, 1801) (Greenland shark)
 Somniosus pacificus Bigelow & Schroeder, 1944 (Pacific sleeper shark)
 Somniosus rostratus (A. Risso, 1827) (little sleeper shark)
 Somniosus sp. A Not yet described (long-nose sleeper shark)
 Genus Zameus D. S. Jordan & Fowler, 1903
 Zameus squamulosus (Günther, 1877) (velvet dogfish)
 Family Squalidae (dogfish sharks)
 Genus Cirrhigaleus S. Tanaka (I), 1912
 Cirrhigaleus asper (Merrett, 1973) (rough-skin spurdog)
 Cirrhigaleus australis W. T. White, Last & J. D. Stevens, 2007 (southern Mandarin dogfish)
 Cirrhigaleus barbifer S. Tanaka (I), 1912 (Mandarin dogfish)
 Genus Squalus Linnaeus, 1758
 Squalus acanthias Linnaeus, 1758 (spiny dogfish)
 Squalus acutipinnis Regan, 1908 (blunt-nose spiny dogfish)
 Squalus albifrons Last, W. T. White & J. D. Stevens, 2007 (eastern high-fin spurdog)
 Squalus altipinnis Last, W. T. White & J. D. Stevens, 2007 (western high-fin spurdog)
 Squalus blainville (A. Risso, 1827) (long-nose spurdog)
 Squalus brevirostris S. Tanaka (I), 1917 (Japanese short-nose spurdog)
 Squalus bucephalus Last, Séret & Pogonoski, 2007 (big-head spurdog)
 Squalus chloroculus Last, W. T. White & Motomura, 2007 (green-eye spurdog)
 Squalus clarkae Pfleger, Grubbs, Cotton & Daly-Engel, 2018 (Genie's dogfish)
 Squalus crassispinus Last, Edmunds & Yearsley, 2007 (fat-spine spurdog)
 Squalus cubensis Howell-Rivero, 1936 (Cuban dogfish)
 Squalus edmundsi W. T. White, Last & J. D. Stevens, 2007 (Edmund's spurdog)
 Squalus formosus W. T. White & Iglésias, 2011 (Taiwan spurdog)
 Squalus grahami W. T. White, Last & J. D. Stevens, 2007 (eastern long-nose spurdog)
 Squalus griffini Phillipps, 1931 (northern spiny dogfish)
 Squalus hemipinnis W. T. White, Last] & Yearsley, 2007 (Indonesian short-snout spurdog)
 Squalus japonicus Ishikawa, 1908 (Japanese spurdog)
 Squalus lalannei Baranes, 2003 (Seychelles spurdog)
 Squalus megalops (W. J. Macleay, 1881) (short-nose spurdog)
 Squalus melanurus Fourmanoir & Rivaton, 1979 (black-tailed spurdog)
 Squalus mitsukurii D. S. Jordan & Snyder, 1903 (short-spine spurdog)
 Squalus montalbani Whitley, 1931 (Indonesian greeneye spurdog)
 Squalus nasutus Last, L. J. Marshall & W. T. White, 2007 (western long-nose spurdog)
 Squalus notocaudatus Last, W. T. White & J. D. Stevens, 2007 (bar-tail spurdog)
 Squalus rancureli  Fourmanoir & Rivaton, 1979 (Cyrano spurdog)
 Squalus raoulensis C. A. J. Duffy & Last, 2007 (Kermadec spiny dogfish)
 Squalus suckleyi (Girard, 1854) (Pacific spiny dogfish)
 Squalus sp. Not yet described (Lombok high-fin spurdog)

Sawsharks (1 family) 
 ORDER PRISTIOPHORIFORMES
 Family Pristiophoridae (sawsharks)
 Genus Pliotrema Regan, 1906
 Pliotrema warreni Regan, 1906  (six-gill sawshark)
 Genus Pristiophorus J. P. Müller & Henle, 1837 
 Pristiophorus cirratus (Latham, 1794) (long-nose sawshark)
 Pristiophorus delicatus Yearsley, Last & W. T. White, 2008 (tropical sawshark)
 Pristiophorus japonicus Günther, 1870 (Japanese sawshark)
 Pristiophorus lanae Ebert & Wilms, 2013 (Lana's sawshark)
 Pristiophorus nancyae Ebert & Cailliet, 2011 (African dwarf sawshark)
 Pristiophorus nudipinnis Günther, 1870 (short-nose sawshark)
 Pristiophorus schroederi S. Springer & Bullis, 1960 (Bahamas sawshark)

Angel sharks (1 family)
 ORDER SQUATINIFORMES
 Family Squatinidae (angel sharks)
 Genus Squatina A. M. C. Duméril, 1806
 Squatina aculeata G. Cuvier, 1829 (saw-back angelshark)
 Squatina africana Regan, 1908 (African angelshark)
 Squatina albipunctata Last & W. T. White, 2008 (eastern angelshark)
 Squatina argentina (Marini, 1930) (Argentine angelshark)
 Squatina armata (Philippi {Krumweide}, 1887) (Chilean angelshark)
 Squatina australis Regan, 1906 (Australian angelshark)
 Squatina caillieti J. H. Walsh, Ebert & L. J. V. Compagno, 2011 (Philippines angelshark)
 Squatina californica Ayres, 1859 (Pacific angelshark)
 Squatina dumeril Lesueur, 1818 (Atlantic angelshark)
 Squatina formosa S. C. Shen & W. H. Ting, 1972 (Taiwan angelshark)
 Squatina guggenheim Marini, 1936 (angular angelshark)
 Squatina heteroptera Castro-Aguirre, Espinoza-Pérez & Huidobro-Campos, 2007 (disparate angelshark)
 Squatina japonica Bleeker, 1858 (Japanese angelshark)
 Squatina legnota Last & W. T. White, 2008 (Indonesian angelshark) 
 Squatina mapama Long, Ebert, Tavera, Pizarro & Robertson, 2021 (short-crested angelshark)
 Squatina mexicana Castro-Aguirre, Espinoza-Pérez & Huidobro-Campos, 2007 (Mexican angelshark)
 Squatina nebulosa Regan, 1906 (clouded angelshark)
 Squatina occulta Vooren & K. G. da Silva, 1992 (hidden angelshark)
 Squatina oculata Bonaparte, 1840 (smooth-back angelshark)
 Squatina pseudocellata Last & W. T. White, 2008 (western angelshark)
 Squatina squatina (Linnaeus, 1758) (angelshark)
 Squatina tergocellata McCulloch, 1914 (ornate angelshark)
 Squatina tergocellatoides J.S.T.F. Chen, 1963 (ocellated angelshark)

Bullhead sharks (1 family)
 ORDER HETERODONTIFORMES
 Family Heterodontidae (bullhead sharks) Genus Heterodontus Blainville, 1816
 Heterodontus francisci (Girard, 1855) (horn shark)
 Heterodontus galeatus (Günther, 1870) (crested bullhead shark)
 Heterodontus japonicus Maclay & W. J. Macleay, 1884 (Japanese bullhead shark)
 Heterodontus mexicanus L. R. Taylor & Castro-Aguirre, 1972 (Mexican hornshark)
 Heterodontus omanensis Z. H. Baldwin, 2005 (Oman bullhead shark)
 Heterodontus portusjacksoni (F. A. A. Meyer, 1793) (Port Jackson shark)
 Heterodontus quoyi (Fréminville, 1840) (Galapagos bullhead shark)
 Heterodontus ramalheira (J. L. B. Smith, 1949) (white-spotted bullhead shark)
 Heterodontus zebra (J. E. Gray, 1831) (zebra bullhead shark)
 Heterodontus sp. X Not yet described (cryptic hornshark)

Mackerel sharks (7 families)
 ORDER LAMNIFORMES Family Alopiidae (thresher sharks)
 Genus Alopias Rafinesque, 1810
 Alopias pelagicus Nakamura, 1935 (pelagic thresher shark) 
 Alopias superciliosus R. T. Lowe, 1841 (big-eye thresher shark) 
 Alopias vulpinus (Bonnaterre, 1788) (thresher shark) 
 Family Cetorhinidae (basking sharks)
 Genus Cetorhinus Blainville, 1816
 Cetorhinus maximus (Gunnerus, 1765) (basking shark)
 Family Lamnidae (mackerel sharks)
 Genus Carcharodon A. Smith, 1838
 Carcharodon carcharias (Linnaeus, 1758) (great white shark) 
 Genus Isurus Rafinesque, 1810
 Isurus oxyrinchus Rafinesque, 1810 (short-fin mako)
 Isurus paucus Guitart-Manday, 1966 (long-fin mako) 
 Genus Lamna G. Cuvier, 1816
 Lamna ditropis C. L. Hubbs & Follett, 1947 (salmon shark) 
 Lamna nasus (Bonnaterre, 1788) (porbeagle shark)
 Family Megachasmidae (megamouth sharks)
 Genus Megachasma L. R. Taylor, . J. V. Compagno & Struhsaker, 1983
 Megachasma pelagios L. R. Taylor, L. J. V. Compagno & Struhsaker, 1983 (megamouth shark)
 Family Mitsukurinidae (goblin sharks)
 Genus Mitsukurina D. S. Jordan, 1898
 Mitsukurina owstoni D. S. Jordan, 1898 (goblin shark)
 Family Odontaspididae (sand tiger sharks)
 Genus Carcharias Rafinesque, 1810
 Carcharias taurus Rafinesque, 1810 (sand tiger shark) 
 Genus Odontaspis Agassiz, 1838
 Odontaspis ferox (A. Risso, 1810) (small-tooth sandtiger shark) 
 Odontaspis noronhai (Maul, 1955) (big-eye sand tiger shark)
 Family Pseudocarchariidae (crocodile sharks)
 Genus Pseudocarcharias Cadenat, 1963
 Pseudocarcharias kamoharai (Matsubara, 1936) (crocodile shark)

Carpet sharks (7 families)
 ORDER ORECTOLOBIFORMES Family Brachaeluridae (blind sharks)
 Genus Brachaelurus J. D. Ogilby, 1908
 Brachaelurus colcloughi J. D. Ogilby, 1908 (blue-grey carpetshark)
 Brachaelurus waddi (Bloch & J. G. Schneider, 1801) (blind shark)
 Family Ginglymostomatidae (nurse sharks)
 Genus Ginglymostoma J. P. Müller & Henle, 1837
 Ginglymostoma cirratum (Bonnaterre, 1788) (nurse shark)
 Ginglymostoma unami Del-Moral-Flores, Ramírez-Antonio, Angulo & Pérez-Ponce de León, 2015 (Pacific nurse shark)
 Genus Nebrius Rüppell, 1837
 Nebrius ferrugineus (Lesson, 1831) (tawny nurse shark)
 Genus Pseudoginglymostoma Dingerkus, 1986
 Pseudoginglymostoma brevicaudatum (Günther, 1867) (short-tail nurse shark)
 Family Hemiscylliidae (bamboo sharks)
 Genus Chiloscyllium J. P. Müller & Henle, 1837
 Chiloscyllium arabicum Gubanov, 1980 (Arabian carpetshark)
 Chiloscyllium burmensis Dingerkus & DeFino, 1983 (Burmese bamboo shark)
 Chiloscyllium griseum J. P. Müller & Henle, 1838 (grey bamboo shark)
 Chiloscyllium hasselti Bleeker, 1852 (Hasselt's bamboo shark)
 Chiloscyllium indicum (J. F. Gmelin, 1789) (slender bamboo shark)
 Chiloscyllium plagiosum (Anonymous, referred to E. T. Bennett, 1830) (white-spotted bamboo shark)
 Chiloscyllium punctatum J. P. Müller & Henle, 1838 (brown-banded bamboo shark)
 Genus Hemiscyllium J. P. Müller & Henle, 1837
 Hemiscyllium freycineti (Quoy & Gaimard, 1824) (Indonesian speckled carpetshark)
 Hemiscyllium galei G. R. Allen & Erdmann, 2008 (Cenderawasih epaulette shark)
 Hemiscyllium hallstromi |Whitley, 1967 (Papuan epaulette shark)
 Hemiscyllium halmahera G. R. Allen, Erdmann & Dudgeon, 2013 (Halmahera epaulette shark)
 Hemiscyllium henryi G. R. Allen & Erdmann, 2008 (Triton epaulette shark)
 Hemiscyllium michaeli G. R. Allen & Dudgeon, 2010 (leopard epaulette shark)
 Hemiscyllium ocellatum (Bonnaterre, 1788) (Epaulette shark)
 Hemiscyllium strahani Whitley, 1967 (hooded carpetshark)
 Hemiscyllium trispeculare J. Richardson, 1843 (speckled carpetshark)
 Hemiscyllium sp. Not yet described (Seychelles carpetshark)
 Family Orectolobidae (Wobbegong sharks)
 Genus Eucrossorhinus Regan, 1908
 Eucrossorhinus dasypogon (Bleeker, 1867) (tasselled wobbegong)
 Genus Orectolobus Bonaparte, 1834
 Orectolobus floridus Last & Chidlow, 2008 (floral banded wobbegong)
 Orectolobus halei Whitley, 1940 (banded wobbegong)
 Orectolobus hutchinsi Last, Chidlow & L. J. V. Compagno, 2006 (western wobbegong)
 Orectolobus japonicus Regan, 1906 (Japanese wobbegong)
 Orectolobus leptolineatus Last, Pogonoski & W. T. White, 2010 (Indonesian wobbegong)
 Orectolobus maculatus (Bonnaterre, 1788) (spotted wobbegong)
 Orectolobus ornatus (De Vis, 1883) (ornate wobbegong)
 Orectolobus parvimaculatus Last & Chidlow, 2008 (dwarf spotted wobbegong)
 Orectolobus reticulatus Last, Pogonoski & W. T. White]], 2008 (network wobbegong)
 Orectolobus wardi Whitley, 1939 (northern wobbegong)
 Genus Sutorectus Whitley, 1939
 Sutorectus tentaculatus (W. K. H. Peters, 1864) (cobbler wobbegong)
 Family Parascylliidae (collared carpetsharks)
 Genus Cirrhoscyllium H. M. Smith & Radcliffe, 1913
 Cirrhoscyllium expolitum H. M. Smith & Radcliffe, 1913 (barbel-throat carpetshark)
 Cirrhoscyllium formosanum Teng, 1959 (Taiwan saddled carpetshark)
 Cirrhoscyllium japonicum Kamohara, 1943 (saddle carpetshark)
 Genus Parascyllium T. N. Gill, 1862
 Parascyllium collare E. P. Ramsay & J. D. Ogilby, 1888 (collared carpetshark)
 Parascyllium elongatum Last & J. D. Stevens, 2008 (elongated carpetshark)
 Parascyllium ferrugineum McCulloch, 1911 (rusty carpetshark)
 Parascyllium sparsimaculatum T. Goto & Last, 2002 (ginger carpetshark)
 Parascyllium variolatum (A. H. A. Duméril, 1853) (necklace carpetshark)
 Family Rhincodontidae (Whale sharks)
 Genus Rhincodon A. Smith, 1828
 Rhincodon typus A. Smith, 1828 (whale shark)
 Family Stegostomatidae (zebra sharks)
 Genus Stegostoma J. P. Müller & Henle, 1837
 Stegostoma fasciatum (Hermann, 1783) (zebra shark)

Ground sharks (8 families)
 ORDER CARCHARHINIFORMESFamily Carcharhinidae (requiem sharks)
 Genus Carcharhinus Blainville, 1816
Carcharhinus acronotus (Poey, 1860) (black-nose shark)
 Carcharhinus albimarginatus (Rüppell, 1837) (silver-tip shark)
 Carcharhinus altimus (S. Springer, 1950) (big-nose shark)
 Carcharhinus amblyrhynchoides (Whitley, 1934) (graceful shark)
 Carcharhinus amblyrhynchos (Bleeker, 1856) (grey reef shark)
 Carcharhinus amboinensis (J. P. Müller & Henle, 1839) (pig-eye shark)
 Carcharhinus borneensis (Bleeker, 1858) (Borneo shark)
 Carcharhinus brachyurus (Günther, 1870) (copper shark)
 Carcharhinus brevipinna (J. P. Müller & Henle, 1839) (spinner shark)
 Carcharhinus cautus (Whitley, 1945) (Nervous shark)
 Carcharhinus cerdale C. H. Gilbert, 1898 (Pacific smalltail shark)
 Carcharhinus coatesi (Whitley, 1939) (Coates' shark)
 Carcharhinus dussumieri (J. P. Müller & Henle, 1839) (white-cheek shark)
 Carcharhinus falciformis (J. P. Müller & Henle, 1839) (silky shark)
 Carcharhinus fitzroyensis (Whitley, 1943) (creek whaler)
 Carcharhinus galapagensis (Snodgrass & Heller, 1905) (Galapagos shark)
 Carcharhinus hemiodon (J. P. Müller & Henle, 1839) (Pondicherry shark)
 Carcharhinus humani W. T. White & Weigmann, 2014 (Human's whaler shark)
 Carcharhinus isodon (J. P. Müller & Henle, 1839) (fine-tooth shark)
 Carcharhinus leiodon Garrick, 1985 (smooth-tooth blacktip shark)
 Carcharhinus leucas (J. P. Müller & Henle, 1839) (bull shark)
 Carcharhinus limbatus (J. P. Müller & Henle, 1839) (black-tip shark)
 Carcharhinus longimanus (Poey, 1861) (oceanic whitetip shark)
 Carcharhinus macloti (J. P. Müller & Henle, 1839) (hard-nose shark)
 Carcharhinus melanopterus (Quoy & Gaimard, 1824) (black-tip reef shark)
 Carcharhinus obscurus (Lesueur, 1818) (dusky shark)
 Carcharhinus perezi (Poey, 1876) (Caribbean reef shark)
 Carcharhinus plumbeus (Nardo, 1827) (sandbar shark)
 Carcharhinus porosus (Ranzani, 1839) (small-tail shark)
 Carcharhinus sealei (Pietschmann, 1913) (black-spot shark)
 Carcharhinus signatus (Poey, 1868) (night shark)
 Carcharhinus sorrah (J. P. Müller & Henle, 1839) (spot-tail shark)
 Carcharhinus tilstoni (Whitley, 1950) (Australian blacktip shark)
 Carcharhinus tjutjot (Bleeker, 1852) (Indonesian whaler shark)
 Carcharhinus sp. A Not yet described  (false smalltail shark)
 Genus Galeocerdo J. P. Müller & Henle, 1837
 Galeocerdo cuvier (Péron & Lesueur, 1822) (tiger shark)
 Genus Glyphis Agassiz, 1843
 Glyphis gangeticus (J. P. Müller & Henle, 1839) (Ganges shark)
 Glyphis garricki L. J. V. Compagno, W. T. White & Last, 2008 (northern river shark)
 Glyphis glyphis (J. P. Müller & Henle, 1839) (spear-tooth shark)
 Glyphis sp. Not yet described (Mukah river shark)
 Genus Isogomphodon T. N. Gill, 1862
 Isogomphodon oxyrhynchus (J. P. Müller & Henle, 1839) (dagger-nose shark)
 Genus Lamiopsis T. N. Gill, 1862
 Lamiopsis temmincki (J. P. Müller & Henle, 1839) (broad-fin shark)
 Lamiopsis tephrodes (Fowler, 1905) (Borneo broadfin shark)
 Genus Loxodon J. P. Müller & Henle, 1839
 Loxodon macrorhinus J. P. Müller & Henle, 1839 (slit-eye shark)
 Genus Nasolamia L. J. V. Compagno & Garrick, 1983
 Nasolamia velox (C. H. Gilbert, 1898) (white-nose shark)
 Genus Negaprion [[Whitley, 1940
 Negaprion acutidens Rüppell, 1837) (sickle-fin lemon shark)
 Negaprion brevirostris (Poey, 1868) (lemon shark)
 Genus Prionace Cantor, 1849
 Prionace glauca (Linnaeus, 1758) (blue shark)
 Genus Rhizoprionodon Whitley, 1929
 Rhizoprionodon acutus (Rüppell, 1837) (milk shark)
 Rhizoprionodon lalandii (J. P. Müller & Henle, 1839) (Brazilian sharpnose shark)
 Rhizoprionodon longurio (D. S. Jordan & C. H. Gilbert, 1882) (Pacific sharpnose shark)
 Rhizoprionodon oligolinx V. G. Springer, 1964 (grey sharpnose shark)
 Rhizoprionodon porosus (Poey, 1861) (Caribbean sharpnose shark)
 Rhizoprionodon taylori (J. D. Ogilby, 1915) (Australian sharpnose shark)
 Rhizoprionodon terraenovae (J. Richardson, 1836) (Atlantic sharpnose shark)
 Genus Scoliodon J. P. Müller & Henle, 1838
 Scoliodon laticaudus J. P. Müller & Henle, 1838 (spade-nose shark)
 Scoliodon macrorhynchos (Bleeker, 1852) (Pacific spade-nose shark)
 Genus Triaenodon J. P. Müller & Henle, 1837
 Triaenodon obesus (Rüppell, 1837) (white-tip reef shark)
 Family Hemigaleidae (weasel sharks)
 Genus Chaenogaleus T. N. Gill, 1862
 Chaenogaleus macrostoma (Bleeker, 1852) (hook-tooth shark)
 Genus Hemigaleus Bleeker, 1852
 Hemigaleus australiensis W. T. White, Last & L. J. V. Compagno, 2005 (Australian weasel shark) 
 Hemigaleus microstoma Bleeker, 1852 (sickle-fin weasel shark) 
 Genus Hemipristis Agassiz, 1843
 Hemipristis elongata (Klunzinger, 1871) (snaggle-tooth shark)
 Genus Paragaleus Budker, 1935
 Paragaleus leucolomatus L. J. V. Compagno & Smale, 1985 (white-tip weasel shark) 
 Paragaleus pectoralis (Garman, 1906) (Atlantic weasel shark)
 Paragaleus randalli L. J. V. Compagno, Krupp & K. E. Carpenter, 1996 (slender weasel shark) 
Paragaleus tengi (J. S. T. F. Chen, 1963) (straight-tooth weasel shark) 
 Family Leptochariidae (barbeled houndsharks)
 Genus Leptocharias A. Smith, 1838
 Leptocharias smithii (J. P. Müller & Henle, 1839)  (barbeled houndshark)
 Family Proscylliidae (fin-back catsharks)
 Genus Ctenacis L. J. V. Compagno, 1973
 Ctenacis fehlmanni (S. Springer, 1968) (harlequin catshark)
 Genus Eridacnis H. M. Smith, 1913
 Eridacnis barbouri (Bigelow & Schroeder, 1944) (Cuban ribbontail catshark)
 Erida H. M. Smith, 1913 (pygmy ribbontail catshark)
 Eridacnis sinuans (J. L. B. Smith, 1957) (African ribbontail catshark)
 Eridacnis sp. 1 Not yet described (Philippines ribbontail catshark)
 Genus Proscyllium Hilgendorf, 1904
 Proscyllium habereri Hilgendorf, 1904 (graceful catshark)
 Proscyllium magnificum Last & Vongpanich, 2004 (magnificent catshark)
 Family Pseudotriakidae (False catsharks)
 Genus Gollum L. J. V. Compagno, 1973
 Gollum attenuatus (Garrick, 1954) (slender smooth-hound)
 Gollum suluensis Last & Gaudiano, 2011 (Sulu gollumshark)
 Gollum sp. B Not yet described (white-marked gollumshark)
 Genus Planonasus Weigmann, Stehmann & Thiel, 2013
 Planonasus parini Weigmann, Stehmann & Thiel, 2013 (dwarf false catshark)
 Genus Pseudotriakis Brito Capello, 1868
 Pseudotriakis microdon Brito Capello, 1868 (false catshark)
 Family Scyliorhinidae (catsharks)
 Genus Apristurus Garman, 1913
 Apristurus albisoma Nakaya & Séret, 1999 (white-bodied catshark)
 Apristurus ampliceps Sasahara, K. Sato & Nakaya, 2008 (rough-skin catshark)
 Apristurus aphyodes Nakaya & Stehmann, 1998 (white ghost catshark)
 Apristurus australis K. Sato, Nakaya & Yorozu, 2008 (Pinocchio catshark)
 Apristurus breviventralis Kawauchi, Weigmann & Nakaya, 2014 (short-belly catshark)
 Apristurus brunneus (C. H. Gilbert, 1892) (brown catshark)
 Apristurus bucephalus W. T. White, Last & Pogonoski, 2008 (big-head catshark)
 Apristurus canutus S. Springer & Heemstra, 1979 (hoary catshark)
 Apristurus exsanguis K. Sato, Nakaya & A. L. Stewart, 1999 (flaccid catshark)
 Apristurus fedorovi Dolganov, 1985 (Fedorov's catshark)
 Apristurus garricki K. Sato, A. L. Stewart & Nakaya, 2013 (Garrick's catshark)
 Apristurus gibbosus Q. W. Meng, Y. T. Chu & S. Li, 1985  (humpback catshark)
 Apristurus herklotsi (Fowler, 1934) (long-fin catshark)
 Apristurus indicus (A. B. Brauer, 1906) (small-belly catshark)
 Apristurus internatus S. M. Deng, G. Q. Xiong & H. X. Zhan, 1988  (short-nose demon catshark)
 Apristurus investigatoris (Misra, 1962) (broad-nose catshark)
 Apristurus japonicus Nakaya, 1975 (Japanese catshark)
 Apristurus kampae L. R. Taylor, 1972 (long-nose catshark)
 Apristurus laurussonii (Sæmundsson, 1922) (Iceland catshark)
 Apristurus longicephalus Nakaya, 1975 (long-head catshark)
 Apristurus macrorhynchus (S. Tanaka (I)], 1909) (flat-head catshark)
 Apristurus macrostomus Q. W. Meng, Y. T. Chu & S. Li, 1985 (broad-mouth catshark)
 Apristurus manis (S. Springer, 1979) (Ghost catshark)
 Apristurus melanoasper Iglésias, Nakaya & Stehmann, 2004 (black rough-scale catshark)
 Apristurus microps (Gilchrist, 1922) (small-eye catshark)
 Apristurus micropterygeus Q. W. Meng, Y. T. Chu & S. Li, 1986 (small-dorsal catshark)
 Apristurus nakayai Iglésias, 2013 (milk-eye catshark)
 Apristurus nasutus F. de Buen, 1959 (large-nose catshark)
 Apristurus parvipinnis S. Springer & Heemstra, 1979 (small-fin catshark)
 Apristurus pinguis S. M. Deng, G. Q. Xiong & H. X. Zhan, 1983 (fat catshark)
 Apristurus platyrhynchus (S. Tanaka (I), 1909) (Borneo catshark)
 Apristurus profundorum (Goode & T. H. Bean, 1896) (deep-water catshark)
 Apristurus riveri Bigelow & Schroeder, 1944 (broad-gill catshark)
 Apristurus saldanha (Barnard, 1925) (Saldanha catshark)
 Apristurus sibogae (M. C. W. Weber, 1913) (pale catshark)
 Apristurus sinensis Y. T. Chu & A. S. Hu, 1981 (South China catshark)
 Apristurus spongiceps (C. H. Gilbert, 1905) (sponge-head catshark)
 Apristurus stenseni (S. Springer, 1979) (Panama ghost catshark)
 Apristurus sp. X Not yet described (Galbraith's catshark)
 Apristurus sp. 3 Not yet described (Black wonder catshark)
 Genus Asymbolus Whitley, 1939
 Asymbolus analis (J. D. Ogilby, 1885) (Australian spotted catshark)
 Asymbolus funebris L. J. V. Compagno, J. D. Stevens & Last, 1999  (blotched catshark)
 Asymbolus galacticus  Séret & Last, 2008 (starry catshark)
 Asymbolus occiduus Last, M. F. Gomon & Gledhill, 1999 (western spotted catshark)
 Asymbolus pallidus Last, M. F. Gomon & Gledhill, 1999 (pale-spotted catshark)
 Asymbolus parvus L. J. V. Compagno, Stevens & Last, 1999 (dwarf catshark)
 Asymbolus rubiginosus Last, M. F. Gomon & Gledhill, 1999 (orange-spotted catshark)
 Asymbolus submaculatus L. J. V. Compagno, J. D. Stevens & Last, 1999 (variegated catshark)
 Asymbolus vincenti (Zietz (fi), 1908) (Gulf catshark)
 Genus Atelomycterus Garman, 1913
 Atelomycterus baliensis W. T. White, Last & Dharmadi, 2005 (Bali catshark)
 Atelomycterus erdmanni Fahmi & W. T. White, 2015 (spotted-belly catshark)
 Atelomycterus fasciatus L. J. V. Compagno & J. D. Stevens, 1993 (banded sand catshark)
 Atelomycterus macleayi Whitley, 1939 (Australian marbled catshark)
 Atelomycterus marmoratus (Anonymous, referred to E. T. Bennett, 1830) (coral catshark)
 Atelomycterus marnkalha Jacobsen & M. B. Bennett, 2007 (eastern banded catshark)
 Genus Aulohalaelurus Fowler, 1934
 Aulohalaelurus kanakorum  Séret, 1990 (Kanakorum catshark)
 Aulohalaelurus labiosus (Waite, 1905) (Australian black-spotted catshark)
 Genus Bythaelurus  L. J. V. Compagno, 1988
 Bythaelurus alcockii (Garman, 1913) (Arabian catshark)
 Bythaelurus canescens (Günther, 1878) (dusky catshark)
 Bythaelurus clevai (Séret, 1987) (broad-head catshark)
 Bythaelurus dawsoni (S. Springer, 1971) (New Zealand catshark)
 Bythaelurus giddingsi J. E. McCosker, Long & C. C. Baldwin, 2012 (jaguar catshark)
 Bythaelurus hispidus (Alcock, 1891) (bristly catshark)
 Bythaelurus immaculatus (Y. T. Chu & Q. W. Meng, 1982) (spotless catshark)
 Bythaelurus incanus Last & J. D. Stevens, 2008 (sombre catshark)
 Bythaelurus lutarius (S. Springer & D'Aubrey, 1972) (mud catshark)
 Bythaelurus naylori Ebert & Clerkin, 2015 (dusky-snout catshark)
 Bythaelurus tenuicephalus Kaschner, Weigmann & Thiel, 2015 (narrow-head catshark)
 Genus Cephaloscyllium T. N. Gill, 1862
 Cephaloscyllium albipinnum Last, Motomura & W. T. White, 2008 (white-fin swellshark)
 Cephaloscyllium cooki Last, Séret & W. T. White, 2008 (Cook's swellshark)
 Cephaloscyllium fasciatum W. L. Y. Chan, 1966 (reticulated swellshark)
 Cephaloscyllium formosanum Teng, 1962 (Formosa swellshark)
 Cephaloscyllium hiscosellum W. T. White & Ebert, 2008 (Australian reticulated swellshark)
 Cephaloscyllium isabellum (Bonnaterre, 1788) (draughtsboard shark)
 Cephaloscyllium laticeps (A. H. A. Duméril, 1853) (Australian swellshark)
 Cephaloscyllium pictum Last, Séret & W. T. White, 2008 (painted swellshark)
 Cephaloscyllium sarawakensis Ka. Yano, A. Ahmad & Gambang, 2005 (Sarawak pygmy swellshark)
 Cephaloscyllium signourum Last, Séret & W. T. White, 2008 (flag-tail swellshark)
 Cephaloscyllium silasi (Talwar, 1974) (Indian swellshark)
 Cephaloscyllium speccum Last, Séret & W. T. White, 2008 (speckled swellshark)
 Cephaloscyllium stevensi E. Clark & J. E. Randall, 2011 (Steven's swellshark)
 Cephaloscyllium sufflans (Regan], 1921) (balloon shark)
 Cephaloscyllium umbratile D. S. Jordan & Fowler, 1903 (blotchy swellshark)
 Cephaloscyllium variegatum Last & W. T. White, 2008 (saddled swellshark)
 Cephaloscyllium ventriosum (Garman, 1880) (swellshark)
 Cephaloscyllium zebrum Last & W. T. White, 2008 (narrow-bar swellshark)
 Cephaloscyllium sp. 1 Not yet described (Philippines swellshark)
 Genus Cephalurus Bigelow & Schroeder, 1941
 Cephalurus cephalus (C. H. Gilbert, 1892) (lollipop catshark)
 Cephalurus sp. A Not yet described (southern lollipop catshark)
 Genus Figaro Whitley, 1928
 Figaro boardmani (Whitley, 1928) (Australian saw-tail catshark)
 Figaro striatus Gledhill, Last & W. T. White, 2008 (northern saw-tail catshark)
 Genus Galeus G. Cuvier, 1816
 Galeus antillensis S. Springer, 1979  (Antilles catshark)
 Galeus arae (Nichols, 1927) (rough-tail catshark)
 Galeus atlanticus (Vaillant, 1888) (Atlantic saw-tail catshark)
 Galeus cadenati S. Springer, 1966 (long-fin saw-tail catshark)
 Galeus eastmani (D. S. Jordan & Snyder, 1904) (gecko catshark)
 Galeus friedrichi Ebert & Jang, 2022 (Philippines sawtail catshark)
 Galeus gracilis L. J. V. Compagno & J. D. Stevens, 1993 (slender saw-tail catshark)
 Galeus longirostris Tachikawa & Taniuchi, 1987 (long-nose saw-tail catshark)
 Galeus melastomus Rafinesque, 1810 (black-mouth catshark)
 Galeus mincaronei Soto, 2001 (southern saw-tail catshark)
 Galeus murinus (Collett, 1904) (mouse catshark)
 Galeus nipponensis Nakaya, 1975 (broad-fin saw-tail catshark)
 Galeus piperatus S. Springer & M. H. Wagner, 1966 (peppered catshark)
 Galeus polli Cadenat, 1959 (African saw-tail catshark)
 Galeus priapus Séret & Last, 2008 (phallic catshark)
 Galeus sauteri (D. S. Jordan & R. E. Richardson, 1909) (black-tip saw-tail catshark)
 Galeus schultzi S. Springer, 1979 (dwarf saw-tail catshark)
 Galeus springeri Konstantinou & Cozzi, 1998 (Springer's saw-tail catshark)
 Genus Halaelurus T. N. Gill, 1862
 Halaelurus boesemani |S. Springer & D'Aubrey, 1972 (speckled catshark)
 Halaelurus buergeri (J. P. Müller & Henle, 1838) (black-spotted catshark)
 Halaelurus lineatus Bass, D'Aubrey & Kistnasamy, 1975 (lined catshark)
 Halaelurus maculosus W. T. White, Last & J. D. Stevens, 2007 (Indonesian speckled catshark)
 Halaelurus natalensis (Regan, 1904) (tiger catshark)
 Halaelurus quagga (Alcock, 1899) (quagga catshark)
 Halaelurus sellus W. T. White, Last & J. D. Stevens, 2007 (rusty catshark)
 Genus Haploblepharus Garman, 1913
 Haploblepharus edwardsii (Schinz, 1822) (puff adder shyshark)
 Haploblepharus fuscus J. L. B. Smith, 1950 (brown shyshark)
Haploblepharus kistnasamyi Human &L. J. V. Compagno, 2006 (natal shyshark)
 Haploblepharus pictus (J. P. Müller & Henle, 1838) (dark shyshark)
 Genus Holohalaelurus Fowler, 1934
 Holohalaelurus favus Human, 2006 (honeycomb catshark)
 Holohalaelurus grennian Human, 2006 (grinning catshark)
 Holohalaelurus melanostigma (Norman, 1939) (crying catshark)
 Holohalaelurus punctatus (Gilchrist, 1914) (white-spotted catshark)
 Holohalaelurus regani (Gilchrist, 1922) (Izak catshark)
 Genus Parmaturus Garman, 1906
 Parmaturus albimarginatus Séret & Last, 2007 (white-tip catshark)
 Parmaturus albipenis Séret & Last, 2007 (white-clasper catshark)
 Parmaturus bigus Séret & Last, 2007 (beige catshark)
 Parmaturus campechiensis S. Springer, 1979 (Campeche catshark)
 Parmaturus lanatus Séret & Last, 2007 (velvet catshark)
 Parmaturus macmillani Hardy, 1985 (McMillan's catshark)
 Parmaturus melanobranchius (W. L. Y. Chan, 1966) (black-gill catshark)
 Parmaturus pilosus Garman, 1906 (salamander catshark)
 Parmaturus xaniurus (C. H. Gilbert, 1892) (file-tail catshark)
 Parmaturus sp. Not yet described (rough-back catshark)
 Parmaturus sp. Not yet described (Indonesian file-tail catshark)
 Parmaturus sp. Not yet described (Gulf of Mexico file-tail catshark)
 Genus Pentanchus H. M. Smith & Radcliffe, 1912
 Pentanchus profundicolus H. M. Smith & Radcliffe, 1912  (one-fin catshark)
 Genus Poroderma A. Smith, 1838
 Poroderma africanum (J. F. Gmelin, 1789) (Striped catshark)
 Poroderma pantherinum (J. P. Müller & Henle, 1838) (leopard catshark)
 Genus Schroederichthys A. Smith, 1838
 Schroederichthys bivius (J. P. Müller & Henle, 1838) (narrow-mouthed catshark)
 Schroederichthys chilensis (Guichenot, 1848) (red-spotted catshark)
 Schroederichthys maculatus S. Springer, 1966 (narrow-tail catshark)
 Schroederichthys saurisqualus Soto, 2001 (lizard catshark)
 Schroederichthys tenuis S. Springer, 1966 (slender catshark)
 Genus Scyliorhinus Blainville, 1816
 Scyliorhinus boa Goode & T. H. Bean, 1896 (boa catshark)
 Scyliorhinus cabofriensis K. D. A. Soares, U. L. Gomes & M. R. de Carvalho, 2016
 Scyliorhinus canicula (Linnaeus, 1758) (small-spotted catshark)
 Scyliorhinus capensis (J. P. Müller & Henle, 1838) (yellow-spotted catshark)
 Scyliorhinus cervigoni Maurin & M. Bonnet, 1970 (West African catshark)
 Scyliorhinus comoroensis L. J. V. Compagno, 1988 (Comoro catshark)
 Scyliorhinus garmani (Fowler, 1934) (brown-spotted catshark)
 Scyliorhinus hachijoensis Ito, Fuji, Nohara, and Tanaka, 2022 (cinder cloudy catshark)
 Scyliorhinus haeckelii (A. Miranda-Ribeiro, 1907) (freckled catshark)
 Scyliorhinus hesperius S. Springer, 1966 (white-saddled catshark)
 Scyliorhinus meadi S. Springer, 1966 (blotched catshark)
 Scyliorhinus retifer (Garman, 1881) (chain catshark)
 Scyliorhinus stellaris (Linnaeus, 1758) (nursehound)
 Scyliorhinus tokubee Shirai, S. Hagiwara & Nakaya, 1992 (Izu catshark)
 Scyliorhinus torazame (S. Tanaka (I), 1908) (cloudy catshark)
 Scyliorhinus torrei Howell-Rivero, 1936 (dwarf catshark)
 Scyliorhinus ugoi K. D. A. Soares, Gadig & U. L. Gomes, 2015 (dark-freckled catshark) 
 Scyliorhinus sp. X Not yet described (Oakley's catshark)
 Family Sphyrnidae (hammerhead sharks)
 Genus Eusphyra T. N. Gill, 1862
 Eusphyra blochii (G. Cuvier, 1816) (wing-head shark)
 Genus Sphyrna Rafinesque, 1810
 Sphyrna corona S. Springer, 1940 (scalloped bonnethead)
 Sphyrna gilberti Quattro, Driggers, Grady, Ulrich & M. A. Roberts, 2013 (Carolina hammerhead)
 Sphyrna lewini (E. Griffith & C. H. Smith, 1834) (scalloped hammerhead)
 Sphyrna media S. Springer, 1940 (scoop-head hammerhead)
 Sphyrna mokarran (Rüppell]], 1837) (great hammerhead)
 Sphyrna tiburo (Linnaeus, 1758) (bonnethead shark)
 Sphyrna tudes (Valenciennes, 1822) (small-eye hammerhead)
 Sphyrna zygaena (Linnaeus, 1758) (smooth hammerhead)
 Family Triakidae (Houndsharks)
 Genus Furgaleus Whitley, 1951
 Furgaleus macki (Whitley, 1943)  (whiskery shark)
 Genus Galeorhinus Blainville, 1816
 Galeorhinus galeus (Linnaeus, 1758) (tope shark)
 Genus Gogolia L. J. V. Compagno, 1973
 Gogolia filewoodi L. J. V. Compagno, 1973 (sail-back houndshark)
 Genus Hemitriakis Herre, 1923
 Hemitriakis abdita L. J. V. Compagno & J. D. Stevens, 1993 (deep-water sickle-fin houndshark)
 Hemitriakis complicofasciata T. Takahashi & Nakaya, 2004 (ocellated topeshark)
 Hemitriakis falcata L. J. V. Compagno & J. D. Stevens, 1993 (sickle-fin houndshark)
 Hemitriakis indroyonoi W. T. White, L. J. V. Compagno & Dharmadi, 2009 (Indonesian houndshark)
 Hemitriakis japanica (J. P. Müller & Henle, 1839) (Japanese topeshark)
 Hemitriakis leucoperiptera Herre, 1923 (white-fin topeshark)
 Genus Hypogaleus J. L. B. Smith, 1957
 Hypogaleus hyugaensis (Miyosi, 1939) (black-tip tope)
 Genus Iago L. J. V. Compagno & S. Springer, 1971
 Iago garricki Fourmanoir & Rivaton, 1979 (long-nose houndshark)
 Iago omanensis (Norman, 1939) (big-eye houndshark)
 Genus Mustelus H. F. Linck, 1790
 Mustelus albipinnis Castro-Aguirre, Antuna-Mendiola, González-Acosta & De La Cruz-Agüero, 2005 (white-margin fin houndshark)
 Mustelus antarcticus Günther, 1870 (gummy shark)
 Mustelus asterias Cloquet, 1821 (starry smooth-hound)
 Mustelus californicus T. N. Gill, 1864 (grey smooth-hound)
 Mustelus canis (Mitchill, 1815) 
 M. c. canis (Mitchill, 1815) (dusky smooth-hound)
 M. c. insularis Heemstra, 1997 (Caribbean smooth-hound)
 Mustelus dorsalis T. N. Gill, 1864 (sharp-tooth smooth-hound)
 Mustelus fasciatus (Garman, 1913) (Striped smooth-hound)
 Mustelus griseus Pietschmann, 1908 (spotless smooth-hound)
 Mustelus henlei (T. N. Gill, 1863) (brown smooth-hound)
 Mustelus higmani S. Springer & R. H. Lowe, 1963 (small-eye smooth-hound)
 Mustelus lenticulatus Phillipps, 1932 (spotted estuary smooth-hound)
 Mustelus lunulatus D. S. Jordan & C. H. Gilbert, 1882 (sickle-fin smooth-hound)
 Mustelus manazo Bleeker, 1854 (star-spotted smooth-hound)
 Mustelus mangalorensis Cubelio, Remya R & Kurup, 2011 (Mangalore houndshark)
 Mustelus mento Cope, 1877 (speckled smooth-hound)
 Mustelus minicanis Heemstra, 1997 (Dwarf smooth-hound)
 Mustelus mosis Hemprich & Ehrenberg, 1899 (Arabian smooth-hound)
 Mustelus mustelus (Linnaeus, 1758) (common smooth-hound)
 Mustelus norrisi S. Springer, 1939 (narrow-fin smooth-hound)
 Mustelus palumbes J. L. B. Smith, 1957 (white-spotted smooth-hound)
 Mustelus punctulatus A. Risso, 1827 (black-spotted smooth-hound)
 Mustelus ravidus W. T. White & Last, 2006 (Australian grey smooth-hound)
 Mustelus schmitti S. Springer, 1939 (narrow-nose smooth-hound)
 Mustelus sinusmexicanus Heemstra, 1997 (Gulf smooth-hound)
 Mustelus stevensi W. T. White & Last, 2008 (western spotted gummy shark)
 Mustelus walkeri W. T. White & Last, 2008 (eastern spotted gummy shark)
 Mustelus whitneyi Chirichigno F., 1973 (humpback smooth-hound)
 Mustelus widodoi W. T. White & Last, 2006 (white-fin smooth-hound)
 Mustelus sp. Not yet described (Sarawak smooth-hound)
 Mustelus sp. Not yet described (Kermadec smooth-hound)
 Genus Scylliogaleus Boulenger, 1902
 Scylliogaleus quecketti Boulenger, 1902 (flap-nose houndshark)
 Genus Triakis J. P. Müller & Henle, 1838
 Triakis acutipinna Kato, 1968 (sharp-fin houndshark)
 Triakis maculata Kner & Steindachner, 1867 (spotted houndshark)
 Triakis megalopterus (A. Smith, 1839) (sharp-tooth houndshark)
 Triakis scyllium J. P. Müller & Henle, 1839 (banded houndshark)
 Triakis semifasciata Girard, 1855 (leopard shark)

Alphabetic sort
 A African angelshark
 African dwarf sawshark
 African frilled shark
 African lanternshark 
 African ribbontail catshark
 African sawtail catshark 
American pocket shark 
 Angelshark
 Angular angelshark 
 Angular roughshark
 Antilles catshark 
 Arabian carpetshark 
 Arabian catshark
 Argentine angelshark
 Arrowhead dogfish 
 Atlantic angel shark 
 Atlantic sawtail catshark
 Atlantic sixgill shark
 Atlantic sharpnose shark 
 Atlantic weasel shark 
 Australian angelshark 
 Australian blackspotted catshark
 Australian blacktip shark 
 Australian grey smooth-hound
 Australian marbled catshark 
 Australian reticulate swellshark 
 Australian sawtail catshark 
 Australian sharpnose shark 
 Australian spotted catshark 
 Australian swellshark 
 Australian weasel shark
 Azores dogfish
 B Bahamas sawshark
 Bali catshark 
 Balloon shark
 Banded houndshark
 Banded sand catshark
 Banded wobbegong
 Bartail spurdog
 Barbelthroat carpetshark
 Barbeled houndshark
 Bareskin dogfish
 Basking shark
 Beige catshark
 Bigeye houndshark
 Bigeye sand tiger
 Bigeye thresher shark
 Bighead catshark
 Bighead spurdog
 Bignose shark
 Bigeyed sixgill shark
 Birdbeak dogfish
 Blackbelly lanternshark
 Black dogfish
 Blackfin gulper shark
 Blackgill catshark
 Blackmouth catshark
 Blackmouth lanternshark
 Blacknose shark
 Black roughscale catshark
 Blackspot shark
 Blackspotted catshark
 Blackspotted smooth-hound
 Blacktail reef shark
 Blacktailed spurdog
 Blacktip reef shark
 Blacktip sawtail catshark
 Blacktip shark
 Blacktip tope
 Black wonder catshark
 Blind shark
 Blotched catshark, two different species
 Blotchy swellshark
 Blue-eye lanternshark
 Bluegrey carpetshark
 Blue shark
 Bluntnose sixgill shark
 Blunt-nose spiny dogfish
 Blurred lanternshark
 Boa catshark
 Bonnethead shark
 Borneo broadfin shark
 Borneo shark
 Bramble shark
 Brazilian sharpnose shark
 Bristled lanternshark
 Bristly catshark
 Broadbanded lanternshark
 Broadfin sawtail catshark
 Broadfin shark
 Broadgill catshark
 Broadhead catshark
 Broadmouth catshark
 Broadnose catshark
 Broadnose sevengill shark
 Broad-snout lanternshark
 Brownbanded bamboo shark
 Brown catshark
 Brown lanternshark
 Brown shyshark
 Brown smoothhound
 Brownspotted catshark 
 Bull shark
 Burmese bamboo shark
 C Campeche catshark
 Caribbean lanternshark
 Caribbean reef shark
 Caribbean roughshark
 Caribbean sharpnose shark
 Caribbean smooth-hound
 Carolina hammerhead
 Cenderawasih epaulette shark
 Chain catshark
 Chilean angelshark
 Chilean lanternshark
 Clouded angelshark
 Cloudy catshark
 Coates' shark
 Cobbler wobbegong
 Collared carpetshark
 Combtooth dogfish
 Combtooth lanternshark
 Common smooth-hound
 Comoro catshark
 Cook's swellshark
 Cookie-cutter shark
 Copper shark
 Coral catshark
 Creek whaler
 Crested bullhead shark
 Crocodile shark
 Crying catshark
 Cuban dogfish
 Cuban ribbontail catshark
 Cylindrical lanternshark
 Cyrano spurdog
 D Daggernose shark
 Dark freckled catshark
 Dark shyshark
 Deepwater catshark
 Deepwater sicklefin houndshark
 Dense-scale lantern shark
 Disparate angelshark
 Draughtsboard shark
 Dumb gulper shark
 Dusky catshark
 Dusky shark
 Dusky smooth-hound
 Dusky snout catshark
 Dwarf catshark
 Dwarf false catshark
 Dwarf gulper shark
 Dwarf lanternshark
 Dwarf sawtail catshark
 Dwarf smooth-hound
 Dwarf spotted wobbegong
 E Eastern angelshark
 Eastern banded catshark
 Eastern highfin spurdog
 Eastern longnose spurdog
 Eastern spotted gummy shark
 Edmund's spurdog
 Elongate carpetshark
 Epaulette shark
 F False catshark
 False lanternshark
 False smalltail shark
 Fat catshark
 Fatspine spurdog
 Fedorov's catshark
 Filetail catshark
 Finetooth shark
 Flaccid catshark
 Flagtail swellshark
 Flapnose houndshark
 Flathead catshark
 Floral banded wobbegong
 Formosa swellshark
 Freckled catshark
 Frilled shark
 Fringefin lanternshark
 Frog shark
 G Galapagos bullhead shark
 Galapagos shark
 Galbraith's catshark
 Ganges shark
 Garrick's catshark
 Gecko catshark
 Genie's dogfish
 Ghost catshark
 Ginger carpetshark
 Goblin shark
 Graceful catshark
 Graceful shark
 Granular dogfish
 Great hammerhead
 Great lanternshark
 Great white shark
 Green-eye spurdog
 Green lanternshark
 Greenland shark
 Grey bamboo shark
 Grey sharpnose shark
 Grey smooth-hound
 Grinning catshark
 Guadalupe lanternshark
 Gulf catshark
 Gulf of Mexico filetail catshark
 Gulf smooth-hound
 Gulper shark
 Gummy shark
 H Halmahera epaulette shark
 Hardnose shark
 Harlequin catshark
 Hasselt's bamboo shark
 Hawaiian lanternshark
 Hidden angelshark
 Highfin dogfish
 Hoary catshark
 Honeycomb Izak
 Hooded carpetshark
 Hooktooth dogfish
 Hooktooth shark
 Horn shark
 Human's whaler shark
 Humpback catshark
 Humpback smooth-hound
 I Iceland catshark
 Indian swellshark
 Indonesian angelshark
 Indonesian filetail catshark
 Indonesian greeneye spurdog
 Indonesian houndshark
 Indonesian shortsnout spurdog
 Indonesian speckled carpetshark
 Indonesian speckled catshark
 Indonesian whaler shark
 Indonesian wobbegong
 Izak catshark
 Izu catshark
 J Jaguar catshark
 Japanese angelshark
 Japanese bullhead shark
 Japanese catshark
 Japanese roughshark
 Japanese sawshark
 Japanese shortnose spurdog
 Japanese spurdog
 Japanese topeshark
 Japanese velvet dogfish
 Japanese wobbegong
 K Kermadec smooth hound
 Kermadec spiny dogfish
 Kitefin shark
 Knifetooth dogfish
 L Lana's sawshark
 Largenose catshark
 Largespine velvet dogfish
 Largetooth cookiecutter shark
 Leafscale gulper shark
 Lemon shark
 Leopard catshark
 Leopard epaulette shark
 Leopard shark
 Lined catshark
 Lined lanternshark
 Lined lanternshark
 Little gulper shark
 Little sleeper shark
 Lizard catshark
 Lollipop catshark
 Lombok highfin spurdog
 Longfin catshark
 Longfin mako
 Longfin sawtail catshark
 Longhead catshark
 Longnose catshark
 Longnose houndshark
 Longnose pygmy shark
 Longnose sawshark
 Longnose sawtail catshark
 Longnose spurdog
 Longnose velvet dogfish
 Longsnout dogfish
 Longnose sleeper shark
 Lowfin gulper shark
 M Magnificent catshark
 Mandarin dogfish
 Mangalore houndshark
 McMillan's catshark
 Megamouth shark
 Mexican angelshark
 Mexican hornshark
 Milk-eye catshark
 Milk shark
 Mini gulper shark
 Moller's lanternshark
 Mosaic gulper shark
 Mouse catshark
 Mud catshark
 Mukah river shark
 N Narrowbar swellshark
 Narrowfin smooth-hound
 Narrowhead catshark
 Narrowmouthed catshark
 Narrownose smooth-hound
 Narrowtail catshark
 Natal shyshark
 Necklace carpetshark
 Nervous shark
 Network wobbegong
 New Caledonia catshark
 New Zealand catshark
 New Zealand lanternshark
 Night shark
 Ninja lanternshark
 Northern river shark
 Northern sawtail catshark
 Northern spiny dogfish
 Northern wobbegong
 Nurse shark
 Nursehound
Nurseblood
 O Oakley's catshark
 Oceanic whitetip shark
 Ocellate topeshark
 Ocellated angelshark
 Oman bullhead shark
 Onefin catshark
 Orange spotted catshark
 Ornate angelshark
 Ornate dogfish
 Ornate wobbegong
 P Pacific angelshark
 Pacific nurse shark
 Pacific sharpnose shark
 Pacific sleeper shark
 Pacific smalltail shark
 Pacific spadenose shark
 Pacific spiny dogfish
 Painted swellshark
 Pale catshark
 Pale spotted catshark
 Panama ghost catshark
 Papua shorttail lanternshark
 Papuan epaulette shark
 Pelagic thresher shark
 Peppered catshark
 Phallic catshark
 Philippines angelshark
 Philippines ribbontail catshark
 Philippines swellshark
 Pigeye shark
 Pink lanternshark
 Pinocchio catshark
 Plunket's shark
 Pocket shark
 Pondicherry shark
 Porbeagle shark
 Port Jackson shark
 Portuguese dogfish
 Prickly dogfish
 Prickly shark
 Puffadder shyshark
 Pygmy lanternshark
 Pygmy ribbontail catshark
 Pygmy shark
 Q Quagga catshark
 R Rasptooth dogfish
 Redspotted catshark
 Reticulated swellshark
 Roughback catshark
 Rough longnose dogfish
 Roughskin catshark
 Roughskin dogfish
 Roughskin spurdog
 Roughtail catshark
 Rusty carpetshark
 Rusty catshark
 S Saddle carpetshark
 Saddled swellshark
 Sailback houndshark
 Sailfin roughshark
 Salamander shark
 Saldanha catshark
 Salmon shark
 Sandtiger shark
 Sandbar shark
 Sarawak pygmy swellshark
 Sarawak smooth-hound
 Sawback angelshark
 Scalloped bonnethead
 Scalloped hammerhead
 Scoophead
 Sculpted lanternshark
 Seychelles carpetshark
 Seychelles gulper shark
 Seychelles spurdog
 Sharpfin houndshark
 Sharpnose sevengill shark
 Sharptooth houndshark
 Sharptooth smooth-hound
 Sherwood dogfish
 Shortbelly catshark
 Shortfin mako
 Shortfin smooth lanternshark
 Shortnose demon catshark
 Shortnose sawshark
 Shortnose spurdog
 Shortspine spurdog
 Shorttail lanternshark
 Shorttail nurse shark
 Sicklefin houndshark
 Sicklefin lemon shark
 Sicklefin smooth-hound
 Sicklefin weasel shark
 Silky shark
 Silvertip shark
 Sixgill sawshark
 Slender bamboo shark
 Slender catshark
 Slender gulper shark
 Slender sawtail catshark
 Slender smooth-hound
 Slender weasel shark
 Sliteye shark
 Smallbelly catshark
 Smalldorsal catshark
 Smalleye catshark
 Smalleye hammerhead
 Smalleye lantern shark
 Smalleye pygmy shark
 Smalleye smooth-hound
 Smallfin catshark
 Smallfin gulper shark
 Small-spotted catshark
 Smalltail shark
 Smalltooth sand tiger
 Smoothback angelshark
 Smooth hammerhead
 Smooth lanternshark
 Smoothtooth blacktip shark
 Snaggletooth shark
 Sombre catshark
 South China catshark
 Southern dogfish
 Southern lanternshark
 Southern lollipop catshark
 Southern mandarin dogfish
 Southern sawtail catshark
 Southern sleeper shark
 Spadenose shark
 Sparsetooth dogfish
 Spatulasnout catshark
 Speartooth shark
 Speckled carpetshark
 Speckled catshark
 Speckled smooth-hound
 Speckled swellshark
 Spined pygmy shark
 Spinner shark
 Spiny dogfish
 Splendid lanternshark
 Spongehead catshark
 Spotless catshark
 Spotless smooth-hound
 Spottail shark
 Spotted-belly catshark
 Spotted estuary smooth-hound
 Spotted houndshark
 Spotted wobbegong
 Springer's sawtail catshark
 Starspotted smooth-hound
 Starry catshark
 Starry smooth-hound
 Steven's swellshark
 Straight-tooth weasel shark
 Striped catshark
 Striped smooth-hound
 Sulu gollumshark
 Swellshark
 T Taillight shark
 Tailspot lanternshark
 Taiwan angelshark
 Taiwan saddled carpetshark
 Taiwan spurdog
 Tasselled wobbegong
 Tawny nurse shark
 Thorny lanternshark
 Thresher shark
 Tiger catshark
 Tiger shark
 Tope shark
 Triton epaulette shark
 Tropical sawshark
 V Variegated catshark
 Velvet belly lanternshark
 Velvet catshark
 Velvet dogfish
 Viper dogfish
 W West African catshark
 West Indian lanternshark
 Western angelshark
 Western gulper shark
 Western highfin spurdog
 Western longnose spurdog
 Western spotted catshark
 Western spotted gummy shark
 Western wobbegong
 Whale shark
 Whiskery shark
 Whitebodied catshark
 Whitecheek shark
 White-clasper catshark
 Whitefin dogfish
 White-fin smooth-hound
 Whitefin swellshark
 Whitefin topeshark
 White ghost catshark
 White-margin fin smooth-hound
 Whitemarked gollumshark
 Whitenose shark
 Whitesaddled catshark
 Whitespotted bamboo shark
 Whitespotted bullhead shark
 Whitespotted catshark
 Whitespotted smooth-hound
 Whitetail dogfish
 White-tip catshark
 Whitetip reef shark
 Whitetip weasel shark
 Winghead shark
 Y Yellowspotted catshark
 Z'''
 Zebra bullhead shark
 Zebra shark

See also

 List of Chimaeras
 List of prehistoric cartilaginous fish genera
 List of threatened sharks
 Outline of sharks

References

Animal Diversity Web

Sharks
Sharks